Opal (formerly Fayettesville) is an unincorporated community and census-designated place (CDP) in Fauquier County, Virginia, United States. The population as of the 2010 census was 691.

Geography
US Route 17 diverges from Route 15 and 29 at Opal, leading southeast  to Fredericksburg. Bealeton is directly south of Opal.

The north and east sides of the community are part of the Potomac River watershed via Licking Run, Cedar Run, and the Occoquan River, while the west and south sides are part of the Rappahannock River watershed, via Tinpot Run and Bowens Run.

History
Opal was chartered in 1798 as Fayettesville.

References

Census-designated places in Fauquier County, Virginia
Census-designated places in Virginia